Yao Mawuko Sènaya (born 18 October 1979 in Lomé) is a Togolese former professional footballer who played as a midfielder. He made 20 appearances for the Togo national team between 1998 and 2008.

He was released by FC La Chaux-de-Fonds in summer 2008.

Personal life
Sènaya is the older brother of the Yao Junior Sènaya, and the father of Marvin Senaya, both professional footballers.

References

External links

1979 births
Living people
Sportspeople from Lomé
Association football midfielders
Togolese footballers
Togo international footballers
1998 African Cup of Nations players
2000 African Cup of Nations players
Togolese expatriate footballers
Expatriate footballers in France
Expatriate footballers in Switzerland
Togolese expatriate sportspeople in France
Ligue 1 players
AS Cannes players
Toulouse FC players
Red Star F.C. players
FC Biel-Bienne players
FC Wangen bei Olten players
SC Young Fellows Juventus players
FC Grenchen players
FC Wohlen players
FC La Chaux-de-Fonds players
Gomido FC players
FC Saint-Louis Neuweg players
21st-century Togolese people